Caterer is a surname. People with the name include:

 Ainslie Caterer (1858-1924), Australian cricketer, cricket administrator and educator
 Brian Caterer (1943–2010), English professional footballer and manager
 Josh Caterer (born 1972), American musician and songwriter from Chicago
 Thomas Caterer (1825–1917), Australian pioneer schoolteacher

See also
 Catering, business of providing food service at a remote site
 The Caterer, a hospitality periodical